Orrin Evans (born 28 March 1975) is an American jazz pianist. Evans was born in Trenton, New Jersey and raised in Philadelphia. He attended Rutgers University, and then studied with Kenny Barron. He worked as a sideman for Bobby Watson, Ralph Peterson, Duane Eubanks, and Lenora Zenzalai-Helm, and released his debut as a leader in 1994. He signed with Criss Cross Jazz in 1997, recording prolifically with the label. He was awarded a 2010 Pew Fellowships in the Arts.

In 2017, Evans was named the new pianist in The Bad Plus replacing Ethan Iverson.

Evans is married to Dawn Warren Evans, who is his manager and an occasional vocalist.

Discography

As leader

References

[ Orrin Evans] at Allmusic

External links
Orrin Evans Discography

 Live recording of concert with the Bill McHenry Quartet at the Village Vanguard

1976 births
Living people
American jazz pianists
American male pianists
Criss Cross Jazz artists
Palmetto Records artists
Pew Fellows in the Arts
Posi-Tone Records artists
American male jazz musicians
Mingus Big Band members
Musicians from Trenton, New Jersey
The Bad Plus members
RogueArt artists
Smoke Sessions Records artists